Versteegh is a Dutch surname. Notable people with the surname include:

Jan Versteegh
Kees Versteegh (born 1947), Dutch linguist
Frank Versteegh (born 1954), Dutch air racer
Pierre Versteegh (1888–1942), Dutch horse rider

See also
Versteeg

Dutch-language surnames